Barış Bağcı (born 27 May 1975, Karaman) is a Turkish theater, cinema, and television actor. He is best known for his role as Baiju Noyan in the TV series Diriliş: Ertuğrul.

Biography
He graduated from Konya Selçuk University Conservatory theater department. After working in Trabzon State Theater, he continued his career at Istanbul State Theater. He played the Mongol commander Baycu Noyan in Diriliş: Ertuğrul. He is playing the role of  Sultan Tuğrul Bey in 
Alparslan: Büyük Selçuklu.

Filmography

Television

Film

References

Turkish male television actors
Turkish male film actors
1975 births
Living people
People from Karaman
Selçuk University alumni